Scene Delete (known in full as Late Night Tales Presents Sasha: Scene Delete) is the third studio album by Welsh DJ Sasha. It was released on 1 April 2016 through Late Night Tales on British independent record label Night Time Stories. The album has been described as "unabashedly ambient" and Sasha described it as "a split in [his] career". Upon release, the album appeared on the UK Albums Chart, peaking at number 34. Four singles were released from the album, "View2", "Warewolf", "Pontiac", and "Bring on the Night-Time". In 2017, three remix singles were released in 2017 comprising remixes of songs from the album, before a remix album, Scene Delete: The Remixes, was released on 19 May 2017.

Background
The album was intended as an appreciation of "post-minimalist modern classical" music, with Sasha citing Max Richter, Nils Frahm, Brian Eno and Steve Reich as influences for the composition of the album. In a press release with Billboard on the topic of the album's composition, prior to its release, Sasha stated:

Scene Delete was originally intended to be a compilation album, like the majority of Late Night Tales releases. Sasha has noted his inspiration from Jon Hopkins' Late Night Tales album, (Late Night Tales: Jon Hopkins), which contained some of Hopkins' original works, as well as other peoples' music. After sending Late Night Tales original works for Scene Delete, Sasha had prepared to license other peoples' music for the album, before the record label proposed that the album be entirely original.

Release
The album was officially announced on 2 February 2016, and the second track, "View2", was shared to Late Night Tales' SoundCloud account. On 1 April 2016, the album saw a digital download and streaming release, as well as a physical release on CD, vinyl and box set. A remix album for Scene Delete was released on 19 May 2017. A "barbican collectors edition" was released on 20 May 2017. Upon its initial release, Scene Delete appeared on the UK and UK Dance Albums charts, peaking at number 34 and number 3 respectively. It also charted in the US, reaching number 6 in the Billboard Dance/Electronic Albums chart.

Track listing

Charts

References

2016 albums
Sasha (DJ) albums
Night Time Stories albums